Green Ukraine, also known as Zelenyi Klyn (literally: 'the green gore/wedge') or Zakytaishchyna (Ukrainian and Russian: , literally: 'Trans China'), is a historical Ukrainian name for the land in the Russian Far East area between the Amur River and the Pacific Ocean, an area roughly corresponding to the Chinese concept of Outer Manchuria.

After the Russian Revolution of 1917, Transcathay was a projected country in the Russian Far East.

After the establishment of the Bolshevik Far Eastern Republic on April 6, 1920, Far Eastern areas with an ethnic Ukrainian majority attempted to secede and establish an entity called Green Ukraine. This movement quickly proved abortive.

Geographically, Green Ukraine borders the present-day North Korea and the Chinese province of Heilongjiang and Jilin.

Historical outline 

 24 June 1917 – First All-Ukrainian Far Eastern Congress at Nikolsk-Ussuriysky formed the Far Eastern Kray Rada (Land Council).
 January 1918 – Second All-Ukrainian Far Eastern Congress at Khabarovsk proclaimed Green Ukraine as part of the Ukrainian State (in spite of the lack of geographical connection).
 April 1918 – The Third All-Ukrainian Far Eastern Congress asked for the creation of an independent Ukrainian state on the Pacific Ocean.
 Summer 1918 – The Far Eastern Ukrainian troops (more than 5,000) enlisted by General Boris Khreschatitsky.
 11 April 1920 – Order of Hetman Grigory Semyonov on the right of Far Eastern Ukrainians for national self-determination and autonomy in the limits of a united Far Eastern state of Cossacks, Buryats, and Ukrainians.
 1922 – Dissolution of Green Ukraine.

Head of the Krai Secretariat:
 June 1918 – 1919 – Yuri Hlushko-Mova (1st time)
 January 1920 – 1922 – Yuri Hlushko-Mova (2nd time)

Territory 
Near the Amur River, Zeya, Svobodny, Blagoveshchensk, Ussuriland, north and south of Nikolayevsk-on-Amur, around Khabarovsk and north of Vladivostok.

Religion 
Most of the Slavic population were Christians. The local Tungusic peoples followed local religions; some Ashkenazi Jews practiced Judaism.

Hydrography 
It would have had a coastline similar to that of the Far Eastern Republic.

History of settlement 
The Zeleny Klyn, or Zelena Ukraina was an area of land settled by Ukrainians which is a part of the Russian Far East in the area of the Amur River and the Pacific Ocean. It was named by the Ukrainian settlers. The territory consists of over 1,000,000 square kilometres and has a population of 3.1 million (1958). The Ukrainian population in 1897 made up 15% of the Primorskaya Oblast's population.

Zeleny Klyn became part of the Russian Empire much later than Siberia and other parts of the Far East. The first attempts at colonizing the area date back to the mid-17th century when Yerofey Khabarov founded the fort of Albazin on the Amur River. From that time, constant skirmishes took place with the Manchu people of China. In 1689 China and Russia signed the Treaty of Nerchinsk, which granted Russia limited territory.

In the mid 19th century, the second Russian expansion took place after Russia lost the Crimean War (1853–1856). A number of Cossack settlements were established on the Amur river. China had become far weaker than Russia at the time and ceded territory to Russia in the Treaty of Aigun of 1858 and by the Convention of Peking of 1860 (see Amur Annexation).

During this period only a small number of settlers settled in the region consisting of some 14,000 Cossacks and 2,500 Russian soldiers. In 1861 two oblasts were established, the Primorsky and Amur. Vladivostok was founded in 1860, Khabarovsk in 1858.

In 1882 free transportation was announced for settlers to the area from Ukraine and free land was offered to settlers. By 1897 the population had increased to 310,000. With the establishment of the railroad in 1901 over 14,000 settlers were moving to the area per year, with a maximum of 78,000 settlers moving there in 1907.

After 1917 the area came under the jurisdiction of Admiral Alexander Kolchak. In 1920 the Far East Republic was established as a buffer republic between Russia and Japan. In 1922 the republic joined with the Russian Soviet Federative Socialist Republic. In 1934 the Jewish Autonomous Oblast region was established with its capital at Birobidzhan.

See also

References

Sources 
 Encyclopedia of Ukraine, Volume 2, Paris 1957

External links 
 Flag of the Green Ukrainian Republic of the Far East 1921
 worldstatesmen.org

Ukrainian diaspora in Siberia
Ukrainian diaspora in Russia
Cultural regions
History of the Russian Far East
Post–Russian Empire states
Former countries in East Asia
Separatism in Russia
1922 in Russia
States and territories disestablished in 1922
Proposed countries